Madison Municipal Airport  is a city-owned, public-use airport located two nautical miles (4 km) northeast of the central business district of Madison, a city in Morgan County, Georgia, United States. It is included in the National Plan of Integrated Airport Systems for 2011–2015, which categorized it as a general aviation facility.

Facilities and aircraft 
Madison Municipal Airport covers an area of 70 acres (28 ha) at an elevation of 694 feet (212 m) above mean sea level. It has one runway designated 14/32 with an asphalt surface measuring 3,806 by 75 feet (1,160 x 23 m).

For the 12-month period ending June 15, 2011, the airport had 4,700 aircraft operations, an average of 12 per day: 94% general aviation and 6% air taxi. At that time there were 20 aircraft based at this airport: 95% single-engine and 5% multi-engine.

References

External links 
 Madison Municipal Airport (52A) at Georgia DOT Airport Directory
 Aerial image as of January 1999 from USGS The National Map
 
 

Airports in Georgia (U.S. state)
Transportation in Morgan County, Georgia